Khanyisa Mayo (born 27 August 1998) is a South African professional soccer player who plays as a forward for Cape Town City and the South Africa national team.

Professional career
Mayo began his senior career in 2017 on loan with Ubuntu Cape Town in the National First Division, from SuperSport United. He transferred to Maccabi in 2018 where he made a solitary appearance that season. He followed that up with a stint at Royal Eagles in the first half of the 2019–20 season, and for the second half he moved to Richards Bay. He earned a move to South African Premier Division side Cape Town City on 28 July 2021.

International career
Mayo was called up to the South Africa national team for a set of friendlies in September 2022. He made his debut with them in a 4–0 friendly win over Sierra Leone on 24 September 2022.

Personal life
Mayo is the son of the former South African international footballer Patrick Mayo.

References

External links
 
 

1998 births
Living people
People from the Eastern Cape
South African soccer players
South Africa international soccer players
South Africa youth international soccer players
Association football forwards
South African Premier Division players
National First Division players
SuperSport United F.C. players
Ubuntu Cape Town F.C. players
Royal Eagles F.C. players
Richards Bay F.C. players
Cape Town City F.C. (2016) players